Korean International School may refer to:

Korean International School in Beijing, China
Korean International School, HCMC, Ho Chi Minh City, Vietnam
Korean International School of Hong Kong
Korean International School Philippines
Korean International School in Shenzhen, China

See also
Korea International School (disambiguation)
:Category:International schools in South Korea